Chess-Nuts is a 1932 Fleischer Studios animated short films starring Betty Boop, and featuring Bimbo and Koko the Clown.

Synopsis

A live action chess game becomes a chaotic, animated quest for the favors of Betty Boop. Betty comes to life as the black queen and Bimbo becomes the white king. The black king, Old King Cole, wants Betty for himself and carries her away to his castle. Bimbo must come to her rescue, with the assistance of Koko and the other chess pieces. When Bimbo breaks into the castle, he engages Old King Cole in a fight, which results in King Cole's death, with Bimbo, Betty, Koko and the other chess characters parading along the chess board. The two men playing chess are shown to have been playing the game for so long that they grow large beards with a spider in a web between the two beards.

The battle contains elements of chess, bowling, football and boxing. Koko appears briefly as part of Bimbo's team of animated chess men.

References

External links
 

1932 films
Betty Boop cartoons
1930s American animated films
American black-and-white films
1932 animated films
Paramount Pictures short films
Fleischer Studios short films
Short films directed by Dave Fleischer
Films about chess